Yulia Andreyevna Inshina (born 15 April 1995) is a Russian-born Azerbaijani artistic gymnast. She has been known for her consistent and reliable work, especially on balance beam. A competitor for Russia for several years, she began to represent Azerbaijan in November 2013.

Personal life
Inshina was born on 15 April 1995 in Voronezh, Russia.

Career
In the early years, Inshina trained alongside Viktoria Komova in Voronezh. The latter is her friend and in 2011 was the World all-around silver medalist.

2011 
At the 2011 Russian Cup, Inshina placed 5th in the all-around, 5th on balance beam, and 5th on the uneven bars, winning silver on floor exercise. She was chosen as a team alternate for the 2011 World Championships, but made the Russian team after Maria Paseka was injured. The Russian team won the silver medal in the team final, with Inshina contributing a beam score of 14.300. She made the balance beam final, and she finished 6th with a score of 14.525.

2012 
In June, Inshina competed at the Russian Cup. She placed third in the all-around behind Viktoria Komova and Aliya Mustafina. She placed fourth on balance beam and on floor exercise. She was added to the Russian Olympic selection squad. In July, Inshina was named an alternate to the Russian team for the Olympics.

2013 
In late November, Inshina and fellow Russian gymnast Anna Pavlova changed nationalities and started competing for Azerbaijan. They wanted more opportunities to compete than they were getting in Russia. She continued training in Russia because Azerbaijan does not have adequate equipment or training centers.

Competitive history

Competitor for  Azerbaijan

Competitor for  Russia

References 

1995 births
Living people
Sportspeople from Voronezh
Russian female artistic gymnasts
Azerbaijani female artistic gymnasts
Gymnasts at the 2015 European Games
European Games competitors for Azerbaijan
Russian emigrants to Azerbaijan
Naturalized citizens of Azerbaijan
Medalists at the World Artistic Gymnastics Championships
Islamic Solidarity Games competitors for Azerbaijan